Staphylococcus chromogenes is a Gram-positive, coagulase-negative member of the bacterial genus Staphylococcus consisting of clustered cocci.  The species is associated with mastitis in dairy animals.

References

Further reading

External links
Type strain of Staphylococcus chromogenes at BacDive -  the Bacterial Diversity Metadatabase

chromogenes